Kerem is a Turkish male given name of Arabic origin, for males, and it means nobility, generosity and greatness. People named Kerem include:

 Kerem Alışık  Turkish actor and television presenter
 Kerem Bulut, Turkish-Australian footballer
 Kerem Demirbay, Turkish-German footballer
 Kerem Gönlüm, Turkish basketball player
 Kerem Kabadayı, Turkish rock musician
 Kerem Özkan, Turkish professional basketball player
 Kerem Öner Turkish entrepreneur
 Kerem Şener (born 2003), Turkish artistic gymniast
 Kerem Şeras, Turkish footballer
 Kerem Tunçeri, Turkish professional basketball player
 Kerem Yılmazer, Turkish actor
 Kerem Bürsin, Turkish actor
 Kerem Suer, Turkish-American software designer
 Kerem Koyluoglu, Turkish-American Social Media Personality
 Kerem Kanter, Turkish basketball player
 Kerem Cem Dürük, Turkish pop singer and actor

Fictional characters
Kerem, protagonist of Turkish folk poetic story Kerem and Aslı and its adaptations

See also

Turkish masculine given names